Taba (also known as East Makian or Makian Dalam) is a Malayo-Polynesian language of the South Halmahera–West New Guinea group. It is spoken mostly on the islands of Makian, Kayoa and southern Halmahera in North Maluku province of Indonesia by about 20,000 people.

Dialects
There are minor differences in dialect between all of the villages on Makian island in which Taba is spoken. Most differences affect only a few words.

Geographic distribution
As of 2005, Ethnologue lists Taba as having a speaking population of approximately 20,000; however, it has been argued by linguists that this number could in reality be anywhere between 20,000 and 50,000. The language is predominantly spoken on Eastern Makian island, although it is also found on Southern Mori island, Kayoa islands, Bacan and Obi island and along the west coast of south Halmahera. There has also been continued migration of speakers to other areas of North Maluku due to frequent volcanic eruptions on Makian island.

Speech levels

, or 'refined' Taba, is used in situations in which the speaker is addressing someone older or of greater status than the speaker themselves.

, or 'ordinary' Taba, is used in most general situations.

The , or 'coarse' form of Taba, is used only rarely and generally in anger.

Phonology
Taba has fifteen indigenous consonant phonemes, and four loan phonemes: .  These are shown below:

Syllables may only have complex onsets at the beginning of morphemic units. The minimal Taba syllable consists of just a vowel, while the maximal indigenous syllable structure is CCVC (there are some examples of CCCVC from Dutch). The structure CCVC, however, is only found in syllables which occur at the beginning of morphemes; non-initial syllables have a maximal structure of CVC. The vast majority of words are mono- or disyllabic.
Taba has five vowels, illustrated on the table below. The front and central vowels are unrounded; the back vowels are rounded.

Grammar

Word order
Taba is, predominantly, a head-marking language which adheres to a basic AVO word order. However, there is a reasonable degree of flexibility.

Taba has both prepositions and postpositions.

Pronouns

In Taba, pronouns constitute an independent, closed set. Syntactically, Taba pronouns can be used in any context where a full noun phrase is applicable. However, independent pronouns are only used in reference to animate entities, unless pronominal reference to inanimate patients is required in reflexive clauses. 

As mentioned, independent pronouns are generally used for animate reference. However, there are two exceptions to this generalisation. In some circumstances an inanimate is considered a 'higher inanimate' which accords syntactic status similar to animates. This is represented as in English where inanimates such as cars or ships, for example, can be ascribed a gender. This is illustrated below in a response to the question 'Why did the Taba Jaya (name of a boat) stop coming to Makian?':

The Taba Jaya, a boat significant enough to be given a name, is accorded pronoun status similar to animates. The other exception occurs in reflexive clauses where a pronominal copy of a reflexive patient is required, as shown below:

Non-human animates and inanimates are always grammatically singular, regardless of how many referents are involved. In Taba, pronouns and noun phrases are marked by person and number.

Person
Taba distinguishes three persons in the pronominal and cross-referencing systems. Person is marked on both pronouns and on cross-referencing proclitics attached to verb phrases. The actor cross-referencing proclitics are outlined in the following table. In the first-person plural, a clusivity distinction is made, 'inclusive' (including the addressee) and 'exclusive' (excluding the addressee), as is common to most Austronesian languages.

The following are examples (4–10) of simple actor intransitive clauses showing each of the proclitic prefixes.

The alternation between proclitic markers indicates number, where in (4) k= denotes the arrival of a singular actor, while in (7) a= indicates the arrival of first-person plural actors, exclusionary of the addressee, and is replicated in the change of prefix in the additional examples.

Number
Number is marked on noun phrases and pronouns. Taba distinguishes grammatically between singular and plural categories, as shown in (3) to (9) above. Plural marking is obligatory for humans and is used for all noun phrases which refer to multiple individuals. Plurality is also used to indicate respect in the second and third Person when addressing or speaking of an individual who is older than the speaker. The rules for marking number on noun phrases are summarised in the table below:

The enclitic =si marks number in noun phrases. =si below (10), indicates that there is more than one child playing on the beach and, in (11), the enclitic indicates that the noun phase , translated as 'mother and father,' is plural.

Plural number is used as a marker of respect not only for second-person addressees, but for third-person referents as seen in (12). In Taba, it has been observed that many adults use deictic shifts towards the perspective of addressee children regarding the use of plural markers. Example (13) is typical of an utterance of an older person than those they are referring to, indicative of respect that should be accorded to the referent by the addressee.

Pronominal affixes 
All Taba verbs having actor arguments carry affixes which cross-reference the number and person of the actor, examples of proclitics are shown above. In Taba, there are valence-changing affixes which deal with patterns of cross-referencing with three distinct patterns. The dominant pattern is used with all verbs having an actor argument. The other two patterns are confined to a small number of verbs: one for the possessive verb, the other for a few verbs of excretion. This is discussed further in Possession below.

Possession
Taba does not, as such, have possessive pronouns. Rather, the possessor noun and the possessed entity are linked by a possessive ligature. The Taba ligatures are shown below:

Adnominal possession
Adnominal possession involves the introduction of an inflected possessive particle between the possessor and the possessed entity; this inflected possessive, formally categorised as a 'ligature', is cross-referenced with the number and person of the possessor. This ligature indicates a possessive relationship between a modifier noun and its head-noun. In Taba, adnominal possession is distinguished by reverse genitive ordering, in which the possessor noun precedes the noun referring to the possessed entity.

In many contexts the possessor will not be overtly referenced.

Example of reverse genitive ordering in Taba:

Obligatory possessive marking
In Taba, alienable and inalienable possession is not obligatorily marked by the use of different forms, though this is common in many related languages. However, there are a number of seemingly inalienable entities which cannot be referred to without referencing a possessor.

For example:

Verbal possession
Verbal possession in Taba is generally indicated through the attaching of the causative prefix  to the adnominal possessive forms. The possessor then becomes actor of the clause, and the possessed entity becomes the undergoer.   This method of forming a possessive verb is very unusual, typologically, and is found in almost no other languages.

Negation 
Like other Central-Eastern Malayo-Polynesian languages spoken in the Maluku Islands, Taba uses different particles to negate declarative and imperative clauses; declaratives are negated using , while imperatives are negated using . In both cases the negative particles are clause-final, a placement which is posited to be the result of contact with non-Austronesian Papuan languages.

Negation of declaratives using  
Declarative clauses are negated using the particle , which follows all other elements of the clause except for modal and aspectual particles (these are discussed below). Examples (15a) and (15b) show negation of an actor intransitive clause, while (16a) and (16b) give negation of a non-actor bivalent clause (i.e. a clause with two undergoer arguments);  has the same clause-final placement regardless of the clause structure.

Negation of complex sentences can be ambiguous — see example (17), where  can operate on either just the complement clause  'I'm going' or to the whole clause complex  'I said I'm going':

Negative existential clauses

 can serve as the predicator of a negative existential clause, with no verb required. It can occur immediately following the noun phrase that refers to whatever is being asserted as non-existent, as in (18):

This marker expresses something about how the non-existence of the noun phrase's referent relates to the discourse context, or alternatively indicates the speaker's attitude towards the proposition. In (19), the discourse marker  (glossed as 'but') is used to indicate that the non-existence of tea, sugar and coffee in the household described by the speaker is counter to one's expectations that a normal household would have these items:

Complex negative modal / aspectual particles

Taba has three complex negative particles which, in addition to negation, express mood or aspect; these are formed by the modal and aspectual particles attaching onto  as clitics.

 (realis negative)

In (20), it is used to emphasize the absolute nature of the prohibition against making alcohol in the Muslim community of the speaker:

 (continuative negative)

'not yet', 'still not'), or some other time relevant to the context of the utterance, as in (21). Unlike the potential negative ,  does not express any expectations about the likelihood of the negated event or state occurring in the future.

 also often appears at the end of the first clause in a sequence of clauses, indicating whatever is referred to by the first clause has not still occurred by the time of the event(s) or state(s) referred to by the following clauses.

 (potential negative)

 shares with  the ability to be used at the end of the first clause in a sequence of clauses, and also carries a similar meaning of incompletion; in addition, it encodes the expectation that the event referred to by the first clause should have happened by the event(s) of the following clauses. This expectation does not need to have actually been fulfilled; the breakfast that was expected to be cooked in the first clause of (24) was, in reality, never cooked due to the ensuing eruption.

Unlike the modal and aspectual markers which are used to form the other complex negative particles,  is not attested as a free morpheme elsewhere; however, it is likely related to the optional final  of the modal verb  'to be unable', which appears to be derived historically from  having fused onto the verb  'to be able'. When used with a final , as in (25b) compared with (25a), this modal verb encodes the same meanings expressed by :

Negation of imperatives using  
Imperative clauses are negated using the admonitive particle . This particle appears to be derived from a verb  'to leave something behind'; however, this verb requires actor cross-referencing, whereas the particle is never cross-referenced. Bowden (2001) posits that the imperative use of  has developed from the use of the independent verb in serial verb constructions, with the morphological elements being lost in the process of grammaticalization. The particle is shown in (26), while the verbal use (with cross-referencing) is shown in (27):

Using negative particles as question tags 
Yes–no (polar) questions can be posed with either positive or negative polarity; positive polarity questions operate in much the same way as in English, while negative polarity questions, which are formed using forms of the negative marker  as question tags, work in a different manner. An example of a positive polarity question is given below in (28a), while (28b) shows a negative polarity question:

Demonstratives and directionals 
Taba has two systems which are both involved in marking deixis: the demonstrative and the directional systems. Although compared to other Austronesian languages Taba is typologically unusual in that its grammar involves little morphology, this is not the case when it comes to demonstratives and directionals. Both of these systems involve root morphemes which can occur either on their own or with affixes, creating a large variety of meanings.

Demonstratives 
Each of these roots can be combined with a variety of morphemes to produce different nouns and pronouns, as follows:

Root forms 
Root forms  and  have a deictic function with respect to the speaker, and can express the speaker's physical, textural, temporal or even emotional and spiritual distance from something. These forms, when used on their own, occur immediately after the noun phrase to which they refer, much like the equivalent forms in many other Malayo-Polynesian languages. Examples of the root forms functioning as such can be seen below:

Demonstrative root forms in Taba, like in most other languages, can also be used to refer to concepts previously mentioned in a conversation, as per the following example:

Although the demonstrative roots are a closed class and most clearly mark deixis, they also belong to a slightly larger class of deictics, including the directional root  ('up'). When this directional root is used deictically, it implies that both the speaker and hearer hold some common knowledge about the referent. Directionals will be discussed in further detail in the next section. See below an example of  functioning deictically:

Demonstrative pronouns 
Taba has four demonstrative pronouns, each formed through the affixation of a pronoun to the demonstrative root. This process, as well as the rough English translation for each pronoun is outlined in the table below:

Taba's demonstrative pronouns can also be used to refer to a concept previously mentioned in a conversation, or a series of previously described events, as shown in the next two examples:

Locative nouns 
The formation of these nouns and their rough English translations can be found in the table below:

Here are two examples showing the locative nouns in use, occurring after the noun to which they refer:

Similative nouns 
Taba has eight similative nouns, which differ between the language's three registers. Many other Austronesian languages have similative noun equivalents, but Taba is unique in that it has such a high number.

Below is an example of a similative noun occurring naturally in a conversation:

Similative nouns in Taba can also occur as single-word utterances and as adverbs, as in the following examples:

Directionals 
As for the directional system, Taba has five basic semantic categories. Like demonstratives, directionals in Taba can be affixed to express more complex meanings, namely motion towards or from a direction, position in a direction, and parts of something that are oriented in a particular direction. This kind of morphology is unusual within Taba, but typologically common compared to many other Austronesian languages. It is worth noting that while the directional roots in Taba can have rough English translations, utterances containing them will often have senseless meanings if translated directly into English.

All Taba directionals formed by affixation can be found in the table below. The essive forms refer to static location in a particular direction and the allative forms refer to motion towards a particular direction. The venitive forms refer to motion away from a particular direction and the nominalised forms refer to parts of something that are oriented in a particular direction.

Essive forms 
Essive directionals in Taba, as stated above, signify static location in a particular direction. These forms can have a larger range of functions when compared with the other directionals. Namely, they can occur as verb adjuncts, both with a locative phrase and alone. They can occur either before or after a verb, or to modify a noun phrase. Shown below is an example of the essive forms being used in a sentence:

Allative forms 
Allative directional forms in Taba express movement towards a particular direction. These forms can occur on their own, after the verb as an adjunct, or at the head of a locative phrase. Examples of these two functions occurring in natural speech are shown below:

Venitive forms 
Venitive directional forms in Taba express movement away from a particular direction. These forms are much freer in word order and can occur at many different places within a clause, serving to modify verbs, as seen in the next two examples:

Venitive forms can also occur in utterances without any verbs, such as in the following example:

The suffix , used to form venitive directionals is likely derived from the word  ('come'), that has been reconstructed for Proto-Austronesian.

Nominalised forms 
Nominalised directional forms in Taba signify parts of an object that are oriented towards a particular direction. These forms are always possessed by and occur after the noun relative to which the location is being expressed. This is illustrated in the following two examples:

{{interlinear|lang=mky|glossing3=yes|number=(50)
|I ntongo {'Happy Restaurant'} ni kle
|i ntongo {'Happy Restaurant'} ni k-le
|3sg 3sgstay {'Happy Restaurant'} 3sg.POSS NOM-land
|'He's staying landwards from the 'Happy Restaurant (Bowden 2001, p. 287)}}

 List of glossing abbreviations 
This section contains only the glossing abbreviations that appear in this article. For a full list, see List of glossing abbreviations.''

SIM:simultaneous aspect
PROX:proximal demonstrative
ADMON:admonitive mood

Name taboo
As is common with many Melanesian people, Taba speakers practice ritual name taboo. As such, when a person dies in a Taba community, their name may not be used by any person with whom they had a close connection. This practice adheres to the Makianese belief that, if the names of the recently deceased are uttered, their spirits may be drastically disturbed. The deceased may be referred to simply as 'Deku's mother' or 'Dula's sister'. Others in the community with the same name as the deceased will be given , or substitute names.

Notes

References 

 
 
 

South Halmahera–West New Guinea languages
Languages of Indonesia
Halmahera